Devaru Kotta Vara is a 1976 Indian Kannada-language film, directed by R. Ramamurthy and produced by R. Rama Sheshan and R. Kashi Vishwanathan. The film stars Vishnuvardhan, Gangadhar, T. N. Balakrishna, and K. S. Ashwath. The film's musical score was done by M. Ranga Rao. The film was a remake of Tamil film Vaazhayadi Vaazhai.

Cast

Vishnuvardhan
Gangadhar
T. N. Balakrishna
K. S. Ashwath
Jayanthi
B. V. Radha
Savitri
Leelavathi
Seetharam
Hanumanthachar
Vijayarao
Keshavamurthy
Shyam
Iyengar
Rathnakar
Sunitha
B. Jayashree
Papamma
Mithravinda

Soundtrack
The music was composed by M. Ranga Rao.

References

External links
 

1976 films
1970s Kannada-language films
Films scored by M. Ranga Rao
Indian drama films
Kannada remakes of Tamil films
Films directed by R. Ramamurthy